Al Walker (born March 19, 1959) is an American former basketball coach. He currently is a pro personnel scout for the Detroit Pistons of the NBA, a position he'd held since 2015. He played college basketball for the Brockport Golden Eagles, won a gold medal with Team USA in the 1981 Maccabiah Games in Israel, and played one year of pro basketball in Israel. He served as the head coach for the Colorado College, Cornell University, Chaminade University of Honolulu and Binghamton University men's basketball teams.

Biography

Playing career
Walker played college basketball from 1978-81 for the Brockport Golden Eagles.  He earned honorable mention on the Small College All-American team. At Brockport, in 2012 he ranked fifth all-time in rebounds (706; 2nd at the time of his graduation) and 20th in scoring (856), while playing only three seasons.

He graduated magna cum laude with a BS in physical education from Brockport State College in 1981, and earned a masters in sports psychology from UNC-Chapel Hill.

Walker is Jewish, and played basketball for Team USA in the 1981 Maccabiah Games in Israel, winning a gold medal with David Blatt, Danny Schayes (the first round draft pick of the NBA's Utah Jazz), and Willie Sims.   In 1982 he then played one year of pro basketball in Israel.

Coaching career
Walker served as the head coach for the Colorado College, Cornell, Chaminade and Binghamton men's basketball teams. Walker was also an advance scout for the Orlando Magic for five seasons until 2012, and an assistant for the University of Buffalo women's basketball team from 2012 to 2013. From 2013 to 2015, he returned to Colorado College where he worked in the Major Gifts office.

Head coaching record

References

1959 births
Living people
American men's basketball coaches
American men's basketball players
American women's basketball coaches
Basketball coaches from New York (state)
Binghamton Bearcats men's basketball coaches
Brockport Golden Eagles men's basketball players
Buffalo Bulls women's basketball coaches
Chaminade Silverswords men's basketball coaches
Colorado College Tigers men's basketball coaches
Competitors at the 1981 Maccabiah Games
Cornell Big Red men's basketball coaches
Jewish American sportspeople
Jewish men's basketball players
Maccabiah Games basketball players of the United States
Maccabiah Games medalists in basketball
Maccabiah Games gold medalists for the United States
Sportspeople from Queens, New York
Basketball players from New York City